Gilbert La Rocque (April 29, 1943 - November 26, 1984) was a Canadian writer from Quebec. He was most noted for his novel Les masques, which was a finalist for the Governor General's Award for French-language fiction at the 1980 Governor General's Awards and won the Prix Suisse-Canada in 1981.

Born in Montreal, La Rocque worked as a bank teller and as a clerk at the city hall of Montréal-Nord prior to the publication of his first novel Le Nombril in 1970. During his writing career, he was also editorial director of the publishing houses Éditions l'Homme, Éditions de l'Aurore and Éditions Québec-Amérique.

He died of a brain tumor in 1984. Following his death, his correspondence with writer Gérard Bessette was published in 1994.

Works

Novels
 Le Nombril (1970)
 Corridors (1971)
 Après la boue (1972)
 Serge d'entre les morts (1976)
 Les Masques (1980) 
 Le Passager (1984)

Plays 
 Le Refuge (1979)

Other 
 Provencher, le dernier des coureurs de bois (1974)
 Le Voleur (1976, with Claude Jodoin)
 Gérard Bessette et Gilbert La Rocque - correspondance (1994)

References

1943 births
1984 deaths
20th-century Canadian novelists
20th-century Canadian dramatists and playwrights
Canadian male novelists
Canadian male dramatists and playwrights
Canadian novelists in French
Canadian dramatists and playwrights in French
Canadian biographers
Writers from Montreal
French Quebecers
20th-century Canadian male writers
Canadian male non-fiction writers
Male biographers